Barshitakli is a city and a tehsil in Akola district in the Indian state of Maharashtra.

Transportation

Railway 
Barshitakli is a railway station on Purna-Khandwa section of South Central Railway (SCR). It was in the Hyderabad division of SCR and now is in the Nanded division after bifurcation of the Hyderabad division. Barshitakli was connected to the broad gauge railway network in 2008 when tracks were extended from Purna to  Akola . People of the city are still waiting for express train facility .  barshitakli has 1 platforms

Geography
It has an average elevation of 310 metres (1020 feet).
Barshitakli is well known for its temples of Lord Shiva (Kholeshwar Mandir)near Vidrupa river and Kalanka Devi Mandir. Barshitakli is railway station on south central route of railway.
18 km in akola district.

Education
Barshitakli has following schools and colleges
1) Babasaheb Dhabekar secondary and higher secondary school.
2) Gulam Nabi Azad college Of Arts, Science and Commerce.
3) Savitribai Phule secondary and higher secondary school.
4) jamat-e-Islami Hind, Barsitakli.
5) Madarsa e Misbahul Uloom, Barsitakli (Near Gulam Nabi Azad College)
6) Z.P.Marathi Boys school.
7) Z.P.Marathi Girls School. 
8) Z.P.Urdu Boys school. 
9) Z.P.Urdu Girls School.
10)Alfalah Urdu Primary School Khadakpura.

Villages in Barshitakali
Ajani Bk. - Alanda (gram Mandal) - Barshitakali - Bhendgaon - Bhendi Sutrak - Bhendimahal - Bormali - Chelka - Chincholi Ru. - Chohogaon - Dagadparwa - Deodari - Dhaba - Dhakali - Dhanora - Donad Bk. - Donad Kh. - Ghota - Gorhwa - Hatola - Jalalabad - Jambhrun - Jambwabhu - Januna - Jmakeshwar - Kajaleshwar - Kanheri - Kasarkhed - Katkhed - Khambora - Kherda Bk. - Kherda Kh. - Khopadi - Kothali Bk. - Kothali Kh. - Lohgad - Mahagaon - Mahan - Mangul - Morgaon Kakad - Morhal - Mozari - Nibhara - Nihida - Nimbi Bk. - Nimbi Kh. - Parabhavani - Paranda - Pardi - Patkhed - Pimpalgaon Hande - Pimpalkhuta - Pimpgalgaon Ch. - Pinjar - Punoti Bk. - Punoti Kh. - Rahit - Rajanda - Rajankhed - Redwa - Rustamabad - Sahit - Sakharkheda - Sakharviwara - Salpi - Sarala (gram Mandal) - Sarao - Sakani - Sawarkhed - Shelu Bk. - Shindkhed - Songoti - Sukali - Tembhi - Titwa - Titwan - Tiwasa - Ujaleshwar - Umardari - Vizora - Wadgaon - Waghjali - Wastapur - Yeranda - Zodaga

Temples
In this city So many temples are exist. 
1) Kholeshwar temple
     On the second day of Hanuman Jayanti, there is a Jupiter of Guru Govind Maharaj. 

2) Hanuman temple
3) Vitthal Rukhamai temple
4) Kalanka Mata Temple
5) Shriram Mandir
6) Mahanubhav sanstan
7) Supinath Maharaj Sanstan
8) Gajanan Maharaj Temple (somwar Peth) 
9) Shri Kala Maroti
10) Guru Govind Math (मठ)

Mosque
In this city many more mosque 

1)Minara masjid 2)aqsa masjid.
3)qadarya masjid.
4)Umarfarooque masjid
5)Abubakar masjid
6)jama masjid
7 Karamat Khan Colony Masjid
8) Imliban Masjid
And many more mosque in BSQ city
(@kingbhai).

References

Cities and towns in Akola district
Talukas in Maharashtra